Baptorhachis is a genus of Southwest African plants in the grass family. The only known species is Baptorhachis foliacea, found only in Mozambique.

See also 
 List of Poaceae genera

References 

Panicoideae
Monotypic Poaceae genera
Endemic flora of Mozambique